Aurus Motors (Russian: Аурус Моторс) is a Russian luxury automobile company founded in 2018, originally strictly as a Russian motorcade vehicle brand until 2021 when the company's first civilian model, the Aurus Senat, began production in May.

Name
According to the company, Aurus is a portmanteau of aura or aurum (Latin for 'gold') and Rus.

History

In 2013, NAMI began development on a new Russian presidential state car to replace the then-current Mercedes-Benz S 600 Pullman Guard.

In 2018, the new Russian presidential state car and motorcade vehicles were introduced under the Aurus Kortezh (Russian for cortege or motorcade) line of vehicles. This includes the Senat sedan and limousine, Arsenal van, and Komendant SUV. The three vehicles are named after Kremlin towers.

On 19 February 2019, the Russia Ministry of Industry and Trade announced that Abu Dhabi, United Arab Emirates-based company Tawazun Holding will invest in a 36% stake of Aurus Motors for US$124 million within the next three years and will distribute Aurus cars in the Middle East.

At the 2019 Geneva International Motor Show in March, Aurus exhibited the Senat and Senat Limousine, previewing future sale of the models.

At the 2019 24 Hours of Le Mans from 15 to 16 June, G-Drive Racing partnered with Aurus and raced an Oreca 07 rebadged as the Aurus 01. The team finished 11th place in the race with 364 laps.

In May 2021, Sollers JSC began civilian-use production of the Senat motorcade car at the Yelabuga, Tatarstan Ford Sollers plant, where the Russian-spec Ford Transit is produced. The base model started at ~18 million rubles (US$243k), while the launch edition model was priced at ~22 million rubles (US$297k).

Models

Kortezh series
The Aurus Kortezh line is developed by NAMI and manufactured by Sollers.

Civilian models
 Senat (2021–present), a full-size luxury sedan
 Senat Limousine (2021–present), an armored limousine based on the Senat sedan

Motorcade vehicles
 Arsenal - a luxury passenger van (Аурус Арсенал)
 Senat - a full-size luxury sedan (Аурус Сенат)
 Senat Convertible - a luxury convertible (Аурус Сенат Кабриолет)
 Senat Limousine - an armored limousine based on the Senat sedan and the official Russian president state car (Аурус Сенат Лимузин)
 Komendant (released in November 2022), a luxury full-size SUV (Комендант)

Upcoming models
 Merlon (to be released in 2023), an electric motorcycle prototype (Мерлон)

Motorsport vehicles
 01, a 2019 Le Mans Prototype built by French manufacturer Oreca

References

External links

 

Luxury motor vehicle manufacturers
Car manufacturers of Russia
Russian brands
Car brands
Aurus Motors